Michael Marquardt (born July 10, 1982 in Vista, California) is a former American football defensive tackle. He was signed by the Cincinnati Bengals as an undrafted free agent in 2008. He played college football at Arizona State.

Marquardt has also been a member of the Carolina Panthers, Philadelphia Eagles, St. Louis Rams and Washington Redskins.

Early years
Marquardt attended Rancho Buena Vista High School in Vista, California. He was named a Prep Star magazine All-American and named All C.I.F. and All-league as a senior. He also earned Palomar League Most-Valuable Player honors as a senior when he had 40 tackles and a team-leading 18 sacks while forcing four fumbles and returning one for a touchdown.

College career

Brigham Young
Marquart began his college career at Brigham Young University in 2000, redshirting that year. In 2001, he played in 10 games for the Cougars and had 11 tackles, including five tackles and three sacks. After the 2001 season he served  mission for the Church of Jesus Christ of Latter-day Saints in Bahía Blanca, Argentina. He returned for the 2004 season and he played in 11 games, totaling five tackles, including one tackle for loss.

Arizona State
Marquart sat out 2005 after transferring to Arizona State University. In 2006, he started 12 of 13 games played and was honorable mention All-Pac-10, totaling 25 tackles (18 solo), 7.5 tackles-for-loss, 3.5 sacks. As a senior, in 2007, he started 11 games and again earned honorable mention All-Pac-10 recognition. He totaled 23 tackles (11 solo), two fumble recoveries and 1.5 tackles-for-loss on the year. Both in 2006 and 2007 he was All-Academic Pac-10 and was  a semifinalist for the 2007 Draddy Trophy, nicknamed the "Academic Hesiman".

Statistics

Key: GP - games played; GS - games started; UA - unassisted tackles; AT - assisted tackles; TT - total tackles; T/L - tackles for a loss; Sacks - ; FF – Forced fumble ; FR – Fumbles recovered; PD - passes deflected; Int - interceptions

Professional career

Pre-draft
Marquardt ran a 4.97 forty-yard dash.

Cincinnati Bengals
After going undrafted in the 2008 NFL Draft, Marquardt signed with the Cincinnati Bengals as an undrafted free agent. He was waived by the team on July 7.

Carolina Panthers
Marquardt was then signed by the Carolina Panthers, but was waived on August 6, 2008.

Philadelphia Eagles
Marquardt was signed by the Philadelphia Eagles on August 10, 2008. He was waived by the team during final cuts, but re-signed to the practice squad on September 1.

St. Louis Rams
Marquardt was signed by the St. Louis Rams on April 2, 2009, only to be released a month later on May 1.

Washington Redskins
Marquardt was signed by the Washington Redskins on August 5, 2009 after the team waived defensive tackle Vaka Manupuna. He was waived on August 30.

References

External links
Arizona State Sun Devils bio
BYU Cougars bio
Philadelphia Eagles bio
Washington Redskins bio

1982 births
Living people
Players of American football from California
Sportspeople from San Diego County, California
Latter Day Saints from California
American Mormon missionaries in Argentina
American football defensive tackles
BYU Cougars football players
Arizona State Sun Devils football players
Cincinnati Bengals players
Carolina Panthers players
Philadelphia Eagles players
St. Louis Rams players
Washington Redskins players
People from Vista, California